The coppery ringtail possum (Pseudochirops cupreus) is a species of marsupial in the family Pseudocheiridae. It is found in Indonesia and Papua New Guinea.

It is known as ymduŋ; bald, kagm, kas-gs, tglem-tud in the Kalam language of Papua New Guinea.

References

Possums
Mammals described in 1897
Taxa named by Oldfield Thomas
Taxonomy articles created by Polbot
Marsupials of New Guinea